Eggins is a surname. Notable people with the surname include:

Jim Eggins (1898–1952), Australian politician
Suzanne Eggins, linguist from Australia

See also
Eggink